is  the Head coach of the Veertien Mie Basketball in the Japanese B.League.

Head coaching record

|-
| style="text-align:left;"|Toyoda Gosei Scorpions
| style="text-align:left;"|2013-14
| 32||12||20|||| style="text-align:center;"|5th|||-||-||-||
| style="text-align:center;"|-
|-
| style="text-align:left;"|Toyoda Gosei Scorpions
| style="text-align:left;"|2014-15
| 32||11||21|||| style="text-align:center;"|6th|||-||-||-||
| style="text-align:center;"|-
|-
| style="text-align:left;"|Toyoda Gosei Scorpions
| style="text-align:left;"|2015-16
| 36||5||31|||| style="text-align:center;"|10th|||-||-||-||
| style="text-align:center;"|-
|-
| style="text-align:left;"|Toyoda Gosei Scorpions
| style="text-align:left;"|2016-17
| 32||5||27|||| style="text-align:center;"|8th in B3|||-||-||-||
| style="text-align:center;"|-
|-
| style="text-align:left;"|Toyoda Gosei Scorpions
| style="text-align:left;"|2017-18
| 32||19||13|||| style="text-align:center;"|5th in B3|||-||-||-||
| style="text-align:center;"|-
|-

References

1978 births
Living people
Doshisha University alumni
Japanese basketball coaches
Toyoda Gosei Scorpions coaches
Toyoda Gosei Scorpions players